Cacio figurato is a type of pasta filata cheese manufactured in Sicily, Italy made from cow's milk.

External links
Caci figurati

Cuisine of Sicily
Italian cheeses
Stretched-curd cheeses